Herb Hand (born January 5, 1968) is an American football coach who is currently the offensive line coach at the University of Central Florida. Prior to that, he was the co-offensive coordinator and offensive line coach at the University of Texas at Austin.

Playing career 
Hand was a three-year starter at Hamilton College, where he played offensive line. A team captain his senior season, Hand earned All-NESCAC honors in 1989. He graduated from Hamilton in 1990 with a degree in history.

Coaching career 
Hand began his coaching career at West Virginia Wesleyan College in 1991 as a defensive graduate assistant, spending three seasons in that role. He earned his MBA from West Virginia Wesleyan in 1993. Hand has also spent time as the defensive coordinator at Glenville State from 1994 to 1996 under Rich Rodriguez and at Concord College in Athens, West Virginia. While at Concord, he also served as the special teams coordinator. He joined the coaching staff at Clemson University in 1999 as an offensive graduate assistant, reuniting with Rodriguez who was Clemson's offensive coordinator and quarterbacks coach. After Rodriguez was named the head coach at West Virginia, Hand joined his staff as tight ends coach and recruiting coordinator.

Tulsa 
When Todd Graham accepted the head coaching position at the University of Tulsa in 2007, he hired Hand to be his co-offensive coordinator and offensive line coach, splitting coordinator duties with Gus Malzahn. After Malzahn left to be the offensive coordinator at Auburn in 2009, Hand was promoted to sole offensive coordinator, as well as assistant head coach.

Vanderbilt 
Hand was named the offensive line coach at Vanderbilt University in 2010, joining Robbie Caldwell's staff. After Caldwell resigned at the end of the 2010 season, Hand was retained by newly hired head coach James Franklin. Hand also added the title of run game coordinator to his duties at the beginning of the 2013 season.

Penn State 
After Franklin accepted the head coaching job at Penn State University, Hand also joined his staff in the same position he held on Franklin's staff at Vanderbilt. Hand made headlines when he announced that he "dropped" a recruit due to their actions over social media.

Auburn 
Hand was named the offensive line coach at Auburn, reuniting with Gus Malzahn, who he shared offensive coordinator duties with during their time at Tulsa.

Texas 
Hand was named the co-offensive coordinator and offensive line coach at the University of Texas in 2018, joining Tom Herman's staff. He was not retained when Herman was fired and replaced by Steve Sarkisian at the end of the 2020 season.

Charlotte 
Hand was hired as the offensive line coach at Charlotte in 2021. He left Charlotte before coaching a game to become the offensive line coach at UCF.

UCF 
Hand left Charlotte to join the coaching staff at UCF, working again with Malzahn.

Personal life 
A native of Westmoreland, New York, Hand and his wife Debbie have two sons, Trey and Cade, and one daughter, Bailey.

Hand suffered a subarachnoid hemorrhage in 2006 while recruiting in Orlando, Florida. Hand was able to avoid having surgery to repair the bleed, and was able to fly back to Morgantown a week later. 
 
A self proclaimed foodie, Hand appeared as a contestant on an episode of Chopped in 2014, making all the way into the entrée round before being eliminated. Hand has also stated on a Reddit AMA that he once cooked a meal for a recruit and was later able to get the recruit to commit.

Hand is an avid rapper, rapping at a Penn State Junior Elite football camp in 2014 to pump up the players, and rapping during a team meeting while at Texas in 2018.

References

External links 
Herb Hand on Twitter
Texas bio
Vanderbilt profile

1968 births
Living people
People from Westmoreland, New York
American football offensive linemen
Hamilton Continentals football players
Hamilton College (New York) alumni
West Virginia Wesleyan Bobcats football coaches
West Virginia Wesleyan College alumni
Glenville State Pioneers football coaches
Concord Mountain Lions football coaches
Clemson Tigers football coaches
West Virginia Mountaineers football coaches
Tulsa Golden Hurricane football coaches
Vanderbilt Commodores football coaches
Penn State Nittany Lions football coaches
Auburn Tigers football coaches
Texas Longhorns football coaches
Charlotte 49ers football coaches
UCF Knights football coaches